Jam City, Inc. (formerly MindJolt and Social Gaming Network) is an American video game developer based in Culver City, California. The company was founded in 2010 by Chris DeWolfe, Colin Digiaro, Aber Whitcomb, and Josh Yguado. Jam City has nine studios located in the United States, Canada, South America, and Europe. As of 2021, it employs 825 people. Netmarble is the largest shareholder in Jam City. As of 2021, Jam City's games have 31 million monthly active users and 1.3 billion total downloads.

History 
Jam City was founded by the Myspace co-founders Chris DeWolfe, Colin Digiaro and Aber Whitcomb, and former 20th Century Fox executive Josh Yguado. The company launched in 2010 when the co-founders raised  from Austin Ventures for their business, then called Platform G. Platform G acquired MindJolt, a social gaming platform founded by Richard Fields, in March 2010 and took its name. Fields remained with the company to lead strategy. The new MindJolt acquired Social Gaming Network (or SGN) and Hallpass Media in April 2011, which added mobile games to the company's portfolio. MindJolt renamed as SGN in March 2012. In June 2013, SGN acquired Mob Science, a developer of social games known for Legends: Rise of a Hero. The company launched the game Panda Pop in 2013, which would later become one of the highest-grossing mobile games. The match-3 puzzle game Cookie Jam launched in 2014. Cookie Jam was named Facebook's game of the year with more than 100 million downloads and 5 million active players at the time. Cookie Jam was also among the 20 highest-grossing mobile games for Google Play and the App Store.

In the wake of Cookie Jams success, the South Korean mobile game company Netmarble invested  in SGN in July 2015, becoming SGN's largest shareholder; this was one of the largest investments in mobile gaming since 2013. By the time of Netmarble's investment, SGN games had been downloaded 500 million times. Following Netmarble's investment, SGN bought the developers Fat Rascal Games and Kiwi Inc. in late 2015, followed by TinyCo in July 2016. The latter acquisition raised SGN's staff count from 125 to 400. Mobile entertainment games that TinyCo had created include Family Guy: The Quest for Stuff and Marvel Avengers Academy. SGN rebranded as Jam City in September 2016, the same year Genies & Gems, a match-3 puzzle game, was launched.

On April 25, 2018, Jam City released Harry Potter: Hogwarts Mystery, a mobile game based on J. K. Rowling's Wizarding World franchise. Within its first day, the game was ranked first on the App Store's free-to-play category and reached tenth place on the list of top-grossing games across categories. It was the fastest of Jam City's games to reach $100 million in revenue, generating  in its first year. By October 2019, it had been downloaded 54.6 million times. The game was nominated for Best Breakthrough Game during the 2019 Google Play Awards.

Jam City bought the intellectual property, management, and development team of Bingo Pop from Uken Games in November 2018, expanding geographically into Toronto, Canada. Also in 2018, Jam City and Disney reached a multi-year deal for Jam City to develop licensed games based on stories and characters from Disney and Pixar. As part of that deal, Jam City took over the game Disney Emoji Blitz. Jam City's first new game under its deal with Disney was Frozen Adventures based on the Frozen and Frozen 2 films, which launched the next year.

Jam City announced in January 2019 that it raised  in funding from JPMorgan Chase Bank, Bank of America Merrill Lynch, and others to support Jam City's acquisitions and global growth initiatives. Jam City acquired Berlin-based studio 231 Play in April. DeWolfe told GamesBeat that the acquisition of studios in Toronto and Berlin allowed Jam City to expand into more game genres, such as solitaire, mahjong, and bingo. According to analytics provider Sensor Tower, solitaire, mahjong, and bingo games ranked among Jam City's top games as of February 2021.

On May 20, 2021, Jam City announced it would become a public company through a merger with DPCM Capital Inc., a special-purpose acquisition company. The merger was expected to close later in 2021. In August 2022, Jam City laid off 150–200 people (17% of its headcount), primarily affecting Ludia.

Selected games 
Most of the games Jam City produces are free-to-play and use microtransactions for players to obtain in-game items or abilities that speed up progression. Jam City's stated business goals include creating high-quality games that generate revenue for years. Jam City's games include both original and licensed intellectual property.

In 2017, Jam City had 50 million monthly active users and it had seven games that have ranked in the 100 highest-grossing charts in the Apple App Store. The company had 31 million monthly active users and 1.3 billion total game downloads in 2021.

{| class="wikitable sortable plainrowheaders"
|-
! scope="col" | Year
! scope="col" | Title
! scope="col" | Genre(s)
! scope="col" | Platform(s)
! scope="col" class="unsortable" | Notes
! scope="col" class="unsortable" | 
|-
! scope="row" rowspan="2" | 2013
| Panda Pop
| Bubble shooter
| rowspan="14" | Android, iOS
| 
| 
|-
| Bingo Pop
| Bingo
| Originally developed by Uken Games; acquired by Jam City in 2018
| 
|-
! scope="row" rowspan="3" | 2014
| Cookie Jam + Cookie Jam Blast
| Match-three game
| 
| 
|-
| Book of Life: Sugar Smash
| Match-three game
| Partnership with Fox and based on the film The Book of Life. This was Jam City's first collaboration with a major Hollywood studio to release a game simultaneously with a film
| 
|- 
| Family Guy: The Quest for Stuff
| City-building game
| Licensed game based on the Family Guy animated sitcom; originally developed by TinyCo
| 
|-
! scope="row" rowspan="2" | 2016
| Disney Emoji Blitz
| Match-three game
| Originally developed by Disney Games; license acquired by Jam City in 2018
| 
|-
| Genies & Gems
| Match-three game
| 
| 
|-
! scope="row" rowspan="3" | 2017
| Futurama: Worlds of Tomorrow
| City building, adventure
| Licensed game based on the Futurama series
| 
|- 
| Snoopy Pop
| Bubble shooter
| Licensed game based on the Peanuts comic strip
| 
|-
| Family Guy: Another Freakin' Mobile Game
| Puzzle, adventure
| Licensed game based on Family Guy 
| 
|-
! scope="row" | 2018
| Harry Potter: Hogwarts Mystery
| Role-playing
| Licensed game based on Harry Potter franchise
| 
|-
! scope="row" rowspan="2" | 2019
| Frozen Adventures
| Match-three, decorating
| Licensed game based on the [[Frozen (franchise)|Frozen franchise]]
| 
|-
| Vineyard Valley| Puzzle, simulation
| 
| 
|-
! scope="row" | 2020
| World War Doh| Strategy, action
| 
| 
|}

 Products and collaborations 
Jam City released a monetization tool, AdJolt, in November 2010. It was made available to third-party developers, who would share revenue generated through AdJolt with MindJolt. In December 2012, Jam City launched MasterKey, which enabled the company to develop cross-platform games without creating separate versions for each platform. MasterKey was described as being technology that "essentially works like a translator or convertor".

In December 2014, SGN and Chinese internet technology company NetEase announced a partnership that enabled Cookie Jam'' to be distributed in China beginning in early 2015.

References

External links 
 

2010 establishments in California
Companies based in Culver City, California
Mobile game companies
American companies established in 2010
Video game companies established in 2010
Video game companies of the United States
Video game development companies